David Fernàndez i Ramos (Barcelona, September 24, 1974) is a Catalan journalist, political and social activist. He was a member of the Parliament of Catalonia in the tenth legislature for the Popular Unity Candidacy (CUP) from December 17, 2012 to August 4, 2015 .

Biography 
Born on September 24, 1974 in Barcelona, he spent the first years of his life in Ripoll (Ripollès). His paternal grandfather, Saturnino Fernández, with whom he identified politically, was a communist, republican, and staunch anti-Franco militant. He studied at the high schools of La Sedeta and Vila de Gràcia, both in Barcelona. He became politically active in the early 1990s. At university, he studied Political Science at the Autonomous University of Barcelona (UAB) but dropped out in the third year of his degree. He spent two years working as a sheet metal worker in the SEAT car factory, until an injury forced him to leave.

In 2006 he published a critical inquiry into the repressive behaviour of the Spanish police Cròniques del 6 i altres retalls de la claveguera policial. On November 13, 2012, together with Julià de Jòdar, he published an explanatory work on the origins and the aims of the Popular Unity Candidacy, entitled Cop de CUP. In 2013, this was followed by Foc a la barraca, a collection of his articles written in previous years.

He is both a writer and editor of the weekly publication, La Directa.

He has been active in the Catalan cooperative, alternative economy and ethical finance movements.

Institutional activity 
Despite never having been a member of any party, he ran for the first time in the 2011 municipal elections in Barcelona in 14th place on the list of the CUP-Alternative for Barcelona (CUP-AB). In October 2012, he became head of the list of the CUP-Alternativa d'Esquerres for Barcelona in the elections to the Parliament of Catalonia in 2012. In those elections, the CUP won three seats, all from the constituency of Barcelona, and Fernández thus became on November 25 the elected deputy of the tenth legislature of the Parliament of Catalonia.

Throughout his parliamentary term, Fernández became particularly well-known for his criticism of the corruption of bankers and politicians in the Parliament of Catalonia's commission of inquiry into the Spanish financial crisis that began in 2008. In November 2013, when the former president of Bankia and former managing director of the IMF Rodrigo Rato was called to testify to this commission, Fernandez ended up brandishing his sandal in an Arab gesture of contempt, and told Rato: “See you soon, gangster!”

In 2014 he was appointed chairman of the Catalan parliamnent's commission of inquiry into tax fraud and evasion and political corruption.

Artistic activity 
He has participated in musical performances in homage to Ovidi Montllor together with Borja Penalba and David Caño forming the musical group Ovidi3,  which has become Ovidi4, including the Valencian singer Mireia Vives.

References

1974 births
Living people
People from Ripollès
Catalan language activists
People from Barcelona
Members of the 10th Parliament of Catalonia